Radio Africa is an album by the Russian band Aquarium.

Radio Africa may also refer to:

 SW Radio Africa, a Zimbabwe radio station
 "Radio Africa" (1985 song) and Radio Africa (1993 album), by British band Latin Quarter
 Radio Africa, a 2010 album by the South African band Freshlyground
 "Radio Africa", a 1985 song by Tullio De Piscopo
 Radio Africa Group, a newspaper publisher; see The Star (Kenya)